Käpplinge murders was the name of a massacre conducted on Käpplingeholmen (now Blasieholmen) in Stockholm in June 1389, when 70 men were placed in a barn house and burned alive. The massacre was performed by the hättebröder as a part of the power struggle at the time between the German burgher party and the Swedish burgher party in the city of Stockholm, when the German burghers supported Albert, King of Sweden, and the Swedish burghers supported Margaret I of Denmark in their rivalry over the throne of Sweden.

References
 Ahnlund, Nils, Från medeltid och vasatid. Historia och kulturhistoria (1933)
 Heyde, Astrid, Käpplingemorden år 1389 : ett 600-årsminne?, S. 9-18. Ur: Sankt Eriksårsbok 1989
 Kumlien, Kjell, "Käpplingemorden", Samfundet S:t Eriks årsbok 1947
 Svenska Familj-Journalen, 1866.

History of Stockholm
14th century in Sweden
Political history of Sweden
1389 in Europe
Conflicts in 1389
Massacres in Sweden
Medieval Sweden
Massacres of men
Violence against men in Europe
Margaret I of Denmark